Nauthólsvík ("bull hill bay") is a Seaside resort and a small neighbourhood in Reykjavík, the capital city of Iceland, about  from Perlan. It has a beach with an artificial hot spring – hot water is pumped into a man-made lagoon.

The area inside the cove is usually a few degrees warmer than the ocean. The service centre also sells beverages and snacks.

Reykjavík University is located in Nauthólsvík in a new building, opened in 2010.

References

External links

Official site

Beaches of Iceland
Seaside resorts in Iceland
Geography of Reykjavík